Miguel Alejandro Silva Jaimes (born 9 July 2000) is a Venezuelan footballer who plays as a goalkeeper.

Career
Silva signed his first professional contract with Deportivo La Guaira when he was 16 years old. For the 2018 season he was loaned to Metropolitanos. In his one season at the club he appeared in 14 league matches.

During May of 2019 he signed with New York Red Bulls II of the USL Championship.

Career statistics

Club

References

2000 births
Living people
Venezuelan footballers
Venezuela under-20 international footballers
Venezuela youth international footballers
Venezuelan expatriate footballers
Association football goalkeepers
Venezuelan Primera División players
Deportivo La Guaira players
Metropolitanos FC players
New York Red Bulls II players
Venezuelan expatriate sportspeople in the United States
Expatriate soccer players in the United States
Sportspeople from Maracay